Hidden Figures is a 2016 American biographical drama film directed by Theodore Melfi and written by Melfi and Allison Schroeder. It is loosely based on the 2016 non-fiction book of the same name by Margot Lee Shetterly about three female African-American mathematicians: Katherine Goble Johnson (Taraji P. Henson), Dorothy Vaughan (Octavia Spencer), and Mary Jackson (Janelle Monáe), who worked at NASA during the Space Race. Other stars include Kevin Costner, Kirsten Dunst, Jim Parsons, Mahershala Ali, Aldis Hodge, and Glen Powell.

Principal photography began in March 2016 in Atlanta, Georgia and wrapped up in May 2016. Other filming locations included several other locations in Georgia, including East Point, Canton, Monroe, Columbus, and Madison.

Hidden Figures had a limited release on December 25, 2016, by 20th Century Fox, before going wide in North America on January 6, 2017. It received critical acclaim, with praise for the performances, particularly those of Henson and Spencer, the writing, direction, cinematography, emotional tone, and historical accuracy, although some argued it featured a white savior narrative. The film was a commercial success, grossing $236 million worldwide against its $25 million production budget. Deadline Hollywood noted it as one of the most profitable releases of 2016, and estimated that it made a net profit of $95.5 million.

The film was chosen by the National Board of Review as one of the top ten films of 2016 and received various awards and nominations, including three nominations at the 89th Academy Awards, including Best Picture. It also won the Screen Actors Guild Award for Outstanding Performance by a Cast in a Motion Picture.

Plot
Katherine Johnson works at the Langley Research Center in Hampton, Virginia in 1961, alongside her colleagues Mary Jackson and Dorothy Vaughan. All of them are African-American women; the unit is segregated by race and sex. White supervisor Vivian Mitchell assigns Katherine to assist Al Harrison's Space Task Group, given her skills in analytic geometry. She becomes the first Black woman on the team; head engineer Paul Stafford is especially dismissive.

Mary is assigned to the space capsule heat shield team, where she immediately identifies a design flaw. Encouraged by her team leader Karl Zielinski, a Polish-Jewish Holocaust survivor, Mary applies for a NASA engineer position. She is told by Mitchell that, regardless of her mathematics and physical science degree, the position requires additional courses. Mary files a petition for permission to attend all-white Hampton High School, despite her husband's opposition. Pleading her case in court, she wins over the local judge by appealing to his sense of history, allowing her to attend night classes.

Katherine meets African-American National Guard Lt. Col. Jim Johnson, who voices skepticism about women's mathematical abilities. He later apologizes and begins spending time with Katherine and her three daughters. The Mercury 7 astronauts visit Langley, and astronaut John Glenn goes out of his way to greet the West Area women. Katherine impresses Harrison by solving a complex mathematical equation from redacted documents, as the Soviet Union's successful launch of Yuri Gagarin increases pressure to send American astronauts into space.

Harrison confronts Katherine about her "breaks," unaware that she is forced to walk half a mile (800 meters) to use the nearest bathroom. She angrily explains the discrimination she faces at work, which leads Harrison to knock down the "Colored Bathroom" sign and abolish bathroom segregation. He allows Katherine to be included in high-level meetings to calculate the space capsule's re-entry point. Stafford makes Katherine remove her name from reports, insisting that "computers" cannot author them, and her work is credited solely to Stafford.

Informed by Mitchell that there are no plans to assign a "permanent supervisor for the colored group," Dorothy learns NASA has installed an IBM 7090 electronic computer that threatens to replace human computers. When a librarian scolds her for visiting the whites-only section, Dorothy takes a book about Fortran and teaches herself and her West Area co-workers programming. She visits the computer room, successfully starts the machine, and is promoted to supervise the Programming Department; she agrees to do so if thirty of her co-workers are transferred as well. Mitchell finally addresses her as "Mrs. Vaughan".

Making final arrangements for John Glenn's launch, the department no longer needs human computers; Katherine is reassigned to the West Area and marries Jim. On the day of the launch, discrepancies are found in the IBM 7090 calculations, and Katherine is asked to check the capsule's landing coordinates. She delivers the results to the control room, and Harrison allows her inside. After a successful launch and orbit, a warning indicates the capsule's heat shield may be loose. Mission Control decides to land Glenn after three orbits instead of seven, and Katherine supports Harrison's suggestion to leave the retro-rocket attached to help keep the heat shield in place. Friendship 7 lands successfully.

Though the mathematicians are ultimately replaced by electronic computers, a textual epilogue reveals Mary obtained her engineering degree and became NASA's first female African-American engineer; Dorothy continued as NASA's first African-American supervisor; and Katherine, accepted by Stafford as a report co-author, went on to calculate the trajectories for the Apollo 11 and Space Shuttle missions. In 2015, she was awarded the Presidential Medal of Freedom. In 2016, NASA dedicated the Langley Research Center's Katherine Johnson Computational Building in her honor.

Cast

Production 
In 2015, producer Donna Gigliotti acquired Margot Lee Shetterly's nonfiction book Hidden Figures, about a group of Black female mathematicians that helped NASA win the Space Race. Allison Schroeder wrote the script, which was developed by Gigliotti through Levantine Films. Schroeder grew up by Cape Canaveral and her grandparents worked at NASA, where she also interned as a teenager, and as a result saw the project as a perfect fit for herself. Levantine Films produced the film with Peter Chernin's Chernin Entertainment. Fox 2000 Pictures acquired the film rights, and Theodore Melfi signed on to direct. After coming aboard, Melfi revised Schroeder's script, and in particular focused on balancing the home lives of the three protagonists with their careers at NASA. After the film's development was announced, actresses considered to play the lead roles included Oprah Winfrey, Viola Davis, Octavia Spencer, and Taraji P. Henson.

Chernin and Jenno Topping produced, along with Gigliotti and Melfi. Fox cast Henson to play the lead role of mathematician Katherine Goble Johnson. Spencer was selected to play Dorothy Vaughan, one of the three lead mathematicians at NASA. Kevin Costner was cast in the film to play the fictional head of the space program. Singer Janelle Monáe signed on to play the third lead mathematician, Mary Jackson. Kirsten Dunst, Glen Powell, and Mahershala Ali were cast in the film: Powell to play astronaut John Glenn, and Ali as Johnson's love interest.

Principal photography began in March 2016 on the campus of Morehouse College in Atlanta, Georgia. Filming also took place at Lockheed Martin Aeronautics at Dobbins Air Reserve Base. Jim Parsons was cast in the film to play the head engineer of the Space Task Group at NASA, Paul Stafford. Pharrell Williams (a native of Virginia Beach, near Langley Research Center) came on board as a producer on the film. He also wrote original songs and handled the music department and soundtrack of the film, with Hans Zimmer and Benjamin Wallfisch. Morehouse College mathematics professor Rudy L. Horne was brought in to be the on-set mathematician.

Music

Historical accuracy
The film, set at NASA Langley Research Center in 1961, depicts segregated facilities such as the West Area Computing unit, where an all-Black group of female mathematicians were originally required to use separate dining and bathroom facilities. However, in reality, Dorothy Vaughan was promoted to supervisor of West Computing much earlier, in 1949, becoming the first Black supervisor at the  National Advisory Committee for Aeronautics (NACA) and one of its few female supervisors. In 1958, when NACA became NASA, segregated facilities, including the West Computing office, were abolished. Vaughan and many of the former West computers transferred to the new Analysis and Computation Division (ACD), a racially and gender-integrated group.

It was Mary Jackson, not Katherine Johnson, who had difficulty finding a colored bathroom — in a 1953 incident she experienced while on temporary assignment in the East Area, a region of Langley unfamiliar to her and where few Blacks worked.

Katherine Johnson, for her part, was initially unaware that the bathrooms at Langley were segregated (in both its East and West areas during the NACA era), and used the "whites-only" bathrooms (many weren't explicitly so labeled) for years before anyone complained. She ignored the complaint, and the issue was dropped.

In an interview with WHRO-TV, Johnson denied the feelings of segregation. "I didn't feel the segregation at NASA, because everybody there was doing research. You had a mission and you worked on it, and it was important to you to do your job ... and play bridge at lunch. I didn't feel any segregation. I knew it was there, but I didn't feel it."

Mary Jackson did not have to get a court order to attend night classes at the whites-only high school. She asked the city of Hampton for an exception, and it was granted. The school turned out to be run down and dilapidated, a hidden cost of running two parallel school systems. She completed her engineering courses and earned a promotion to engineer in 1958.

Katherine Johnson worked mostly in Langley's West Area, not the East Area — working mainly in Building 1244 starting in mid-1953, and remaining in 1244 even after joining the Space Task Group, through at least the early 1960s and John Glenn's historic flight.

The scene where a coffeepot labeled "colored" appears in Katherine Johnson's workplace did not happen in real life, and the book on which the film is based depicts no such incident.

Katherine Johnson carpooled with Eunice Smith, a nine-year West Area computer veteran at the time Johnson joined NACA. Smith was her neighbor and friend from her sorority and church choir. The three Goble children were teenagers at the time of Katherine's marriage to Jim Johnson.

Katherine Johnson was assigned to the Flight Research Division in 1953, a move that soon became permanent. When the Space Task Group was created in 1958, engineers from the Flight Research Division formed the core of the group, and Johnson was included. She coauthored a research report published by NASA in 1960, the first time a woman in the Flight Research Division had received credit as an author of a research report. Johnson gained access to editorial meetings as of 1958 simply through persistence, not because one particular meeting was critical.

The Space Task Group was led by Robert Gilruth, not the fictional character Al Harrison, who was created to simplify a more complex management structure. The scene where Harrison smashes the Colored Ladies Room sign never happened, as in real life Johnson refused to walk the extra distance to use the colored bathroom and, in her words, "just went to the white one." Harrison also lets her into Mission Control to witness the launch. Neither scene happened in real life, and screenwriter Theodore Melfi said he saw no problem with adding the scenes, saying, "There needs to be white people who do the right thing, there needs to be Black people who do the right thing, and someone does the right thing. And so who cares who does the right thing, as long as the right thing is achieved?"

Dexter Thomas of Vice News criticized Melfi's additions as creating the white savior trope: "In this case, it means that a white person doesn't have to think about the possibility that, were they around back in the 1960s South, they might have been one of the bad ones." The Atlantics Megan Garber said that the film's "narrative trajectory" involved "thematic elements of the white savior". Melfi said he found "hurtful" the "accusations of a 'white savior' storyline", saying:

The Huffington Posts Zeba Blay said of Melfi's frustration:

The fictional characters Vivian Mitchell and Paul Stafford are composites of several team members, and reflect common social views and attitudes of the time. Karl Zielinski is based on Mary Jackson's mentor, Kazimierz "Kaz" Czarnecki.

John Glenn, who was about a decade older than depicted at the time of launch, did ask specifically for Johnson to verify the IBM calculations, although she had several days before the launch date to complete the process.

Author Margot Lee Shetterly has agreed that there are differences between her book and the movie, but found that to be understandable.
For better or for worse, there is history, there is the book and then there's the movie. Timelines had to be conflated and [there were] composite characters, and for most people [who have seen the movie] have already taken that as the literal fact. ... You might get the indication in the movie that these were the only people doing those jobs, when in reality we know they worked in teams, and those teams had other teams. There were sections, branches, divisions, and they all went up to a director. There were so many people required to make this happen. ... It would be great for people to understand that there were so many more people. Even though Katherine Johnson, in this role, was a hero, there were so many others that were required to do other kinds of tests and checks to make [Glenn's] mission come to fruition. But I understand you can't make a movie with 300 characters. It is simply not possible.

John Glenn's flight was not terminated early as stated in the movie's closing subtitles. The MA-6 mission was planned for three orbits and landed at the expected time. The press kit published before launch states that "The Mercury Operations Director may elect a one, two or three orbit mission." The post-mission report also shows that retrofire was scheduled to occur on the third orbit.  Scott Carpenter's subsequent flight in May was also scheduled and flew for three orbits, and Wally Schirra's planned six-orbit flight in October required extensive modifications to the Mercury capsule's life-support system to allow him to fly a nine-hour mission. The phrase "go for at least seven orbits" that is in the mission transcript refers to the fact that the Atlas booster had placed Glenn's capsule into an orbit that would be stable for at least seven orbits, not that he had permission to stay up that long.

The Mercury Control Center was located at Cape Canaveral in Florida, not at the Langley Research Center in Virginia. The orbit plots displayed in the front of the room incorrectly show a six-orbit mission, which did not happen until Wally Schirra's MA-8 mission in October 1962. The movie also incorrectly shows NASA flight controllers monitoring live telemetry from the Soviet Vostok launch, which the Soviet Union would not have been sharing with NASA in 1961.

Katherine Johnson's Technical Note D-233, co-written with T.H. Skopinski, can be found on the NASA Technical Reports Server.

The movie depicts the IBM 7090 as the first computer at Langley, but there were actually earlier computers there, and Dorothy Vaughan had previously been programming for the IBM 704 in FORTRAN.

The movie refers to an IBM 7090 but the console shown is for an IBM 7094, which came later.

Release 

The film began a limited release on December 25, 2016, before a wide release on January 6, 2017.

Charity screenings 
After Hidden Figures was released on December 25, 2016, certain charities, institutions and independent businesses who regard the film as relevant to the cause of improving youth awareness in education and careers in the science, technology, engineering, and mathematics (STEM) fields, organized free screenings of the film in order to spread the message of the film's subject matter. A collaborative effort between Western New York STEM Hub, AT&T and the Girl Scouts of the USA allowed more than 200 Buffalo Public School students, Girl Scouts and teachers to see the film. WBFO's Senior Reporter Eileen Buckley stated the event was designed to help encourage a new generation of women to consider STEM careers. Research indicates that by 2020, there will be 2.4 million unfilled STEM jobs. Aspiring astronaut Naia Butler-Craig wrote of the film: "I can’t imagine what that would have been like: 16-year-old, impressionable, curious and space-obsessed Naia finding out that Black women had something to do with getting Americans on the moon."

Also, the film's principal actors (Henson, Spencer, Monáe and Parsons), director (Melfi), producer/musical creator (Williams), and other non-profit outside groups have offered free screenings to Hidden Figures at several cinema locations around the world. Some of the screenings were open to all-comers, while others were arranged to benefit girls, women and the underprivileged. The campaign began as individual activism by Spencer, and made a total of more than 1,500 seats for Hidden Figures available, free of charge, to poor individuals and families. The result was seven more screenings for people who otherwise might not have been able to afford to see the film - in Atlanta (sponsored by Monáe), in Washington, D.C. (sponsored by Henson), in Chicago (also Henson), in Houston (by Parsons), in Hazelwood, Missouri (by Melfi and actress/co-producer Kimberly Quinn), and in Norfolk and Virginia Beach, Virginia (both sponsored by Williams).

In February 2017, AMC Theatres and 21st Century Fox announced that free screenings of Hidden Figures would take place in celebration of Black History Month in up to 14 select U.S. cities (including Atlanta, Chicago, Dallas, Los Angeles and Miami). The statement described the February charity screenings as building broader awareness of the film's true story of Black women mathematicians who worked at NASA during the Space Race. 21st Century Fox and AMC Theatres also invited schools, community groups and non-profit organizations to apply for additional special screenings to be held in their towns. "As we celebrate Black History Month and look ahead to Women's History Month in March, this story of empowerment and perseverance is more relevant than ever," said Liba Rubenstein, 21st Century Fox's Senior Vice President of Social Impact, "We at 21CF were inspired by the grassroots movement to bring this film to audiences that wouldn't otherwise be able to see it - audiences that might include future innovators and barrier-breakers - and we wanted to support and extend that movement".

Philanthropic non-profit outside groups and other local efforts by individuals have offered free screenings of Hidden Figures by using crowdfunding platforms on the Internet, that allow people to raise money for free film screening events. Dozens of other GoFundMe free screening campaigns have appeared since the film's general release, all by people wanting to raise money to pay for students to see the film.

In 2019, The Walt Disney Company partnered with the U.S. Department of State on the third annual "Hidden No More" exchange program, which was inspired by the film and brings to the United States 50 women from around the world who have excelled in STEM careers such as spacecraft engineering, data solutions and data privacy, and STEM-related education. The exchange program began in 2017 after local US embassies screened the film to their local communities. The support for the screenings was so positive that 48 countries decided to each nominate one women in STEM to represent their country on a three-week IVLP exchange program in the United States.

Merchandising
Following the 2017 Lego Ideas Contest, Denmark-based toy maker The Lego Group announced plans to manufacture a fan-designed Women of NASA figurine set of five female scientists, engineers and astronauts, as based on real women who have worked for NASA. The minifigures planned for inclusion in the set were Katherine Johnson, computer scientist Margaret Hamilton; astronaut, physicist and educator Sally Ride; astronomer Nancy Grace Roman; and astronaut and physician Mae Jemison (who is also African American). The finished set did not include Johnson. The Women of NASA set was released November 1, 2017.

The Miracles' 1961 chart hit, "Mighty Good Lovin'", written by lead singer Smokey Robinson, is played in the film during the house party dance scene, and was also heard in the closing credits.

Home media
Hidden Figures was released on Digital HD on March 28, 2017, and Blu-ray, 4K Ultra HD, and DVD on April 11, 2017. The film debuted at No. 3 on the home video sales chart.

Reception

Box office
Hidden Figures grossed $169.6 million in the United States and Canada, and $66.3 million in other territories, for a worldwide gross of $236 million, against a production budget of $25 million. Domestically, Hidden Figures was the highest-grossing Best Picture nominee at the 89th Academy Awards. Deadline Hollywood calculated the net profit of the film to be $95.55 million, when factoring together all expenses and revenues for the film, making it one of the top twenty most profitable release of 2016.

During its limited release in 25 theaters from December 25, 2016, to January 5, 2017, the film grossed $3 million. In North America, Hidden Figures had its expansion alongside the opening of Underworld: Blood Wars and the wide expansions of Lion and A Monster Calls. It was expected to gross around $20 million from 2,471 theaters in its opening weekend, with the studio projecting a more conservative $15–17 million debut. It made $1.2 million from Thursday night previews and $7.6 million on its first day. Initially, projections had the film grossing $21.8 million in its opening weekend, finishing second behind Rogue One: A Star Wars Story ($22 million). However the next day, final figures revealed the film tallied a weekend total of $22.8 million, beating Rogue Ones $21.9 million. In its second weekend, the film grossed $20.5 million (for a four-day MLK Weekend total of $27.5 million), again topping the box office.

Critical response 

On review aggregator Rotten Tomatoes, the film has an approval rating of 93% based on 314 reviews, with an average rating of 7.64/10. The website's critical consensus reads, "In heartwarming, crowd-pleasing fashion, Hidden Figures celebrates overlooked—and crucial—contributions from a pivotal moment in American history." On Metacritic, the film has a weighted average score of 74 out of 100, based on 47 critics, indicating "generally favorable reviews". Audiences polled by CinemaScore gave the film an average grade of "A+" on an A+ to F scale, one of fewer than 90 films in the history of the service to receive such a score.

Simon Thompson of IGN gave the film a rating of nine out of ten, writing, "Hidden Figures fills in an all too forgotten, or simply too widely unknown, blank in US history in a classy, engaging, entertaining and hugely fulfilling way. Superb performances across the board and a fascinating story alone make Hidden Figures a solid, an accomplished and deftly executed movie that entertains, engages and earns your time, money and attention." Ty Burr of The Boston Globe wrote, "the film's made with more heart than art and more skill than subtlety, and it works primarily because of the women that it portrays and the actresses who portray them. Best of all, you come out of the movie knowing who Katherine Johnson and Dorothy Vaughn and Mary Jackson are, and so do your daughters and sons."

Clayton Davis of Awards Circuit gave the film three and a half stars, saying "Precisely marketed as terrific adult entertainment for the Christmas season, Hidden Figures is a faithful and truly beautiful portrait of our country's consistent gloss over the racial tensions that have divided and continue to plague the fabric of our existence. Lavishly engaging from start to finish, Hidden Figures may be able to catch the most inopportune movie-goer off guard and cause them to fall for its undeniable and classic storytelling. The film is not to be missed."

Other reviews criticized the film for its fictional embellishments and conventional, feel-good style. Tim Grierson, writing for Screen International, states that "Hidden Figures is almost patronisingly earnest in its depiction of sexism and racism. An air of do-gooder self-satisfaction hovers over the proceedings", while Jesse Hassenger at The A.V. Club comments that "lack of surprise is in this movie's bones." Eric Kohn of IndieWire argues that the film "trivializes history; as a hagiographic tribute to its brilliant protagonists, it doesn't dig into the essence of their struggles" and similarly, Paul Byrnes concludes that "When a film purports to be selling history, we're entitled to ask where the history went, even if it offers a good time instead."

Accolades 

Among its many achievements, Octavia Spencer was particularly lauded for her portrayal of Dorothy Vaughan and was nominated for the Academy Award for Best Supporting Actress, Golden Globe Award for Best Supporting Actress  Motion Picture and Screen Actors Guild Award for Outstanding Performance by a Female Actor in a Supporting Role. The film's ensemble cast won the Screen Actors Guild Award for Outstanding Performance by a Cast in a Motion Picture. The film itself garnered a nomination for the Academy Award for Best Picture and several nominations its screenplay (including for the Oscar and BAFTA), soundtrack and score.

Overall, the film received three nominations for the 89th Academy Awards in 2017, winning none:
 Best Picture  Donna Gigliotti, Peter Chernin, Jenno Topping, Pharrell Williams and Theodore Melfi (lost to Moonlight)
 Best Supporting Actress  Octavia Spencer (lost to Viola Davis for Fences)
 Best Adapted Screenplay  Allison Schroeder and Theodore Melfi (based on the book Hidden Figures: The American Dream and the Untold Story of the Black Women Who Helped Win the Space Race) (lost to Moonlight)

See also
 African-American women in computer science
 Henrietta Swan Leavitt
 List of black films of the 2010s
 Mathematical fiction
 Women in science

References

Further reading

External links 

 
 
 
 Hidden Figures at History vs. Hollywood

2016 films
2016 biographical drama films
2010s historical drama films
African-American biographical dramas
American films based on actual events
American historical drama films
Biographical films about mathematicians
Biographical films about scientists
Drama films based on actual events
Films scored by Hans Zimmer
Films scored by Pharrell Williams
Films scored by Benjamin Wallfisch
Films about astronauts
Films about computing
Films about mathematics
Films about NASA
Films about racism
Films about sexism
Films about women in the United States
20th Century Fox films
Films based on non-fiction books
Films directed by Theodore Melfi
Films set in 1926
Films set in the 1960s
Films set in 1961
Films set in 1962
Films set in Florida
Films set in Virginia
Films set in West Virginia
Films shot in Atlanta
Project Mercury
Women in mathematics
Women in science and technology
John Glenn
2016 drama films
Films based on biographies
Chernin Entertainment films
History of women in West Virginia
2010s feminist films
2010s female buddy films
2010s English-language films
2010s American films